Shoutin' is an album by American saxophonist Don Wilkerson recorded in 1963 and released on the Blue Note label.

Reception
The Allmusic review by Stephen Thomas Erlewine awarded the album 4 stars and stated "the high quality of the music on this album, as well as Wilkerson's other three records, will make most soul-jazz fans regret that this was his last record. It will also make them treasure the albums all the more."

Track listing
All compositions by Don Wilkerson except as indicated

 "Movin' Out" - 5:27
 "Cookin' With Clarence" - 7:30
 "Easy Living"  (Ralph Rainger, Leo Robin) - 6:08
 "Happy Johnny" - 5:35
 "Blues for J" - 6:11
 "Sweet Cake" (Edward Frank) - 6:01

Personnel
Don Wilkerson - tenor saxophone
John Patton - organ
Grant Green - guitar
Ben Dixon - drums

References

Blue Note Records albums
Don Wilkerson albums
1963 albums
Albums recorded at Van Gelder Studio
Albums produced by Alfred Lion